Beaumont-en-Cambrésis is a commune in the Nord department in northern France. In 1794 the Battle of Beaumont took place near Beaumont-en-Cambrésis as a part of the French Revolutionary Wars.

Population

Heraldry

See also
Communes of the Nord department

References

Communes of Nord (French department)